WECA-LP is an American low-power FM radio station licensed by the Federal Communications Commission (FCC) to serve the community of Palm Bay, Florida on the frequency of 105.7 MHz. The station license is assigned to New Birth F. Baptist Church, Inc. WECA-LP airs a Christian radio format.

The FCC first licensed this station to begin operations on March 14, 2016, using callsign WECA-LP; the station's call sign had been assigned on May 13, 2015.

References

External links
 Official WECA-LP Website 
 

ECA-LP
Radio stations established in 2016
2016 establishments in Florida
ECA-LP